Gaeana maculata is the type species of cicadas in the genus Gaeana. It was first described by Dru Drury in 1773, from China.

Description
Upper side: head black. Eyes yellow brown, round, and projecting from the head a little; between them are two small orange spots. Antennae small and short. Thorax black, with four orange spots in a row, placed across it, and behind them two others. Abdomen black, consisting of seven annuli or rings, besides the tail part, the last of which is edged with orange. Anus orange-coloured, and furnished with a bristle for oviposition. Wings black, spotted, and streaked with orange; the anterior having a row of streaks along the external edges, and five distinct orange spots crossing the middle, near the shoulders: the posterior having a large orange patch on the abdominal edges, and a small round spot above it, with five small fainter ones placed along the external edges.

Under side: head black, terminating in a long slender beak, which extends between the legs, to the abdomen; two small orange spots are placed just below the eyes. Thorax with an orange spot on each side. Legs and abdomen black; the latter having six orange spots, three on each side. Wings as on the upper side. Wing-span 3¾ inches (95 mm).

References

Gaeanini
Insects described in 1773
Descriptions from Illustrations of Exotic Entomology
Insects of China
Taxa named by Dru Drury